Shahid Mofatteh Stadium is a multi-use stadium in Hamedan, Iran.  It is used mostly for football matches, on club level by PAS Hamedan F.C. The stadium has a capacity of 15,000 spectators.

References

Football venues in Iran
Buildings and structures in Hamadan Province
Sport in Hamadan Province